Thomas James Lawless (born December 19, 1956 in Erie, Pennsylvania) is a former Major League Baseball player who played between  and , appearing with the Cincinnati Reds, Montreal Expos, St. Louis Cardinals, and Toronto Blue Jays.

He was the interim manager of the Houston Astros in 2014.

Career
Lawless grew up in Erie, Pennsylvania, attending Strong Vincent High School and Penn State Behrend, where he played baseball from 1975-1978.

Lawless became famous in  when he became the only player ever traded for Pete Rose.

Lawless, who only hit two regular-season home runs in his career, is also remembered for his dramatic go-ahead home run in Game 4 of the 1987 World Series (he had hit .080 in 25 at-bats during the regular season.) Lawless later expressed shock that he had managed to hit a home run. "When it went over the wall, I thought, 'Holy cow, it went out.' I went blank. I don't remember flipping the bat."

On  May 10, 1989, while with the Toronto Blue Jays, Lawless' ninth-inning single broke up a no-hit bid by Mark Langston of the Seattle Mariners.

A fast and highly skilled baserunner, Lawless struggled to hit major league pitching and retired in 1990.  He entered the coaching ranks and has become a successful minor league manager.  In 2007, he served as a coach for the China national baseball team during its participation in Major League Baseball's Instructional League program and in the Arizona Fall League.  He managed the Lexington Legends, the Class A affiliate of the Houston Astros, for the 2009 season. On November 16, 2009, Lawless was named the new manager for the Lancaster JetHawks, the Class A Advanced affiliate of the Houston Astros, for the 2010 season. In 2011, Lawless was managing the Corpus Christi Hooks of the Texas League.  On September 1, 2014 after the Astros fired Bo Porter, Lawless was hired as the interim manager. As interim manager with Houston, he had a record of 11 wins and 13 losses.

Managerial record

References

External links

1956 births
Living people
American expatriate baseball players in Canada
Baseball players from Pennsylvania
Billings Mustangs players
Cincinnati Reds players
Houston Astros managers
Indianapolis Indians players
Louisville Redbirds players
Major League Baseball left fielders
Major League Baseball right fielders
Major League Baseball second basemen
Major League Baseball third basemen
Minor league baseball managers
Montreal Expos players
Penn State Nittany Lions baseball players
Sportspeople from Erie, Pennsylvania
St. Louis Cardinals players
Tampa Tarpons (1957–1987) players
Toronto Blue Jays players
Waterbury Reds players
Wichita Aeros players